Interstate 81 (I-81) is a north–south Interstate Highway, stretching from Dandridge, Tennessee, northeast to Fisher's Landing, New York, at the Canada–United States border. It is the longest north–south Interstate in Pennsylvania.

Route description

In Chambersburg at exit 16, it meets U.S. Route 30 (US 30; the Chambersburg Pike to Gettysburg). The stretch of US 11 connecting I-81 to I-76 is known locally as the "Miracle Mile" since it contains plenty of traveler services including restaurants, gas stations, lodging, truck stops, and shops. From here, I-81 travels in an almost precisely east–west direction for the next  (until exit 89). At exit 59, it has an interchange with the western terminus of PA 581. I-81 becomes the Capital Beltway from exit 59 to exit 70. At exit 67, the road comes to a stack interchange with US 22 and US 322; US 322 merges with I-81. Exit 70 is the eastern terminus of the US 322 concurrency and the northern terminus of I-83 and is located in Colonial Park. For the entire segment between the Mason–Dixon line and I-78, I-81 runs through the Great Valley. North of Harrisburg between I-83/US 322 and I-78, the highway passes near Hershey and Fort Indiantown Gap.

At milemarker 89, I-81 meets the western terminus of I-78; I-78 picks up the eastward route through the Great Valley and heads toward Allentown and New York City, while I-81 turns back northward, cutting through Blue Mountain at Swatara Gap. From milemarkers 141 to 146, I-81 passes near the city of Hazleton. At exit 151, I-81 meets I-80. At exit 175, I-81 meets with PA 315, which will lead passengers to I-476 (Pennsylvania Turnpike Northeast Extension). In Scranton at milemarker 185, there is a short freeway called the President Biden Expressway, which will lead passengers into downtown Scranton. At milemarker 187, I-81 is at the Throop Dunmore Interchange, which consists of I-84, I-380, and US 6. At milemarker 194 is the northern terminus of I-476. The last exit in Pennsylvania is exit 230, which is PA 171 near Hallstead.

History

A toll highway along the present-day I-81 corridor through Pennsylvania was planned in the 1950s. The section from Scranton to the New York state line was planned as a continuation of the Northeast Extension of the Pennsylvania Turnpike. A new extension of the turnpike between Harrisburg and Scranton was also proposed. After the Federal-Aid Highway Act of 1956 was passed, plans were changed to build a free Interstate Highway rather than a toll road. The first section to be built ran from PA 347 in Dunmore to US 11 in northern Scranton, this section opening in 1960. All of I-81 in Pennsylvania was completed by the 1970s. Construction cost nearly $443 million (equivalent to $ in ).

On May 9, 2013, a tanker crashed and caught fire at the interchange between I-81 and US 22/US 322 in Harrisburg. The fire damaged the bridges carrying westbound US 22/US 322 and a ramp over I-81. At least one of those bridges, carrying US 22 eastbound over I-81 and several ramps, and possibly another, the ramp carrying traffic from I-81 northbound to US 22/US 322 westbound, would have to be demolished and replaced. The highway was not fully reopened until the evening of May 13.

Future

Scranton Beltway 
On April 28, 2016, plans were announced for a Scranton Beltway to use the Pennsylvania Turnpike Northeast Extension (I-476) as a bypass for I-81 around the heavily congested segment through Scranton and its suburbs. The turnpike between the two I-81 interchanges carries an average of 10,000 vehicles per day versus 80,000 on the parallel segment of I-81. This project will build two high-speed connections between I-476 and I-81: one south of Scranton in Dupont and one north of Scranton in South Abington Township. Tolls on the connections will be paid with E-ZPass or toll by plate. Construction of this project is expected to cost $160 million. In 2021, design work on the project resumed, with construction expected to begin in 2025.

New interchange in Chambersburg 
On October 24, 2018, the Pennsylvania Department of Transportation (PennDOT) released their plans for a new exit 12 on I-81, at Guilford Springs Road, estimated to cost around $23 million. The purpose for the exit is to improve access for trucks to the various distribution warehouses south of Chambersburg, such as Target. As such, Guilford Springs Road will be widened to three lanes as a part of this project. PennDOT has started obtaining environmental clearances and will start to seek rights-of-way in 2020 from approximately 7-10 properties. PennDOT will look at bids for construction starting in 2023.

Exit list

See also

References

External links

 Pennsylvania Highways: Interstate 81
 I-81 at AARoads.com
 Pennsylvania Roads - I-81

81
 Pennsylvania
Roads in the Harrisburg, Pennsylvania area
Transportation in Franklin County, Pennsylvania
Transportation in Cumberland County, Pennsylvania
Transportation in Dauphin County, Pennsylvania
Transportation in Lebanon County, Pennsylvania
Transportation in Schuylkill County, Pennsylvania
Transportation in Luzerne County, Pennsylvania
Transportation in Lackawanna County, Pennsylvania
Transportation in Susquehanna County, Pennsylvania